Below the Lights is the seventh full-length album by Norwegian heavy metal band Enslaved.  Beyond it being their last full-length for production company Osmose (they would move to Candlelight for their next studio album), a few lineup changes would take place.  This would be the last album Enslaved recorded with Dirge Rep on drums (he also co-wrote two songs), and the first album featuring Arve Isdal as lead guitarist.  They would also enlist a full-time keyboardist in Herbrand Larsen (who helped engineer the record), bringing the band personnel from four to five.

Critical reception 
AllMusic's William York wrote a positive review of the album, writing that "for all its variety, this is still a fairly heavy, meat-and-potatoes album with plenty of emotional nuance as well. There are a few spots where Enslaved's ambitions get the better of them, but the experimentation is welcome in any case, and most of it does work. Below the Lights will likely stand out down the road as one of the top black metal releases of 2003." In 2016, About.com named it the best Enslaved album to date, highlighting it for being "everything the band had been slowly building towards was fully realized", fully unleashing the band's potential, and "their crowning achievement."

Track listing

"Havenless" contains excerpts from Aksel Sandemose's "Vi pynter oss med horn".

Personnel

Enslaved
 Grutle Kjellson – bass guitar, vocals
 Arve Isdal – guitar
 Ivar Bjørnson – guitars, keyboards, effectors
 Per Husebø (a.k.a. Dirge Rep) – drums

Additional musicians
Gina Torgnes: Flute on "Queen of Night"
Bjørgvin Tungrock Kor: Choir & Chants on "Havenless"
Inge Rypdal: Lead Guitar on "A Darker Place"
Dennis Reksten: Additional Synthesizers & Effects

Technical personnel
Arranged By Enslaved
Produced By Pytten, Jørgen Træen, Ivar Peersen & Grutle Kjellson
Engineered By Pytten, Herbrand Larsen & Davide Bertolini 
Mixed By Ivar Bjornson, Grutle Kjellson & Jørgen Træen at Duper Studios in Bergen
Mastered By Nicholas Ramaget, Pierre Dechamps (both at Digipro Studios) & Jørgen Træen (at Duper Studios)
All Songs Published By Les Editions Hurlantes.

References 

 

Enslaved (band) albums
2003 albums
The End Records albums
Osmose Productions albums